North Oakland is an area in Oakland, California, United States, bordered by Downtown Oakland, Oakland Hills, and the adjacent cities of Berkeley, Emeryville and Piedmont. Annexed to Oakland in 1897. It is known as the birthplace of the Black Panther Party and is the childhood home of both its co-founders, Dr. Huey P. Newton and Bobby Seale.

Neighborhoods
According to a project commissioned by the city in 1982 to define Oakland's neighborhoods for landscaping purposes, North Oakland comprises the following neighborhoods:

 
Bushrod Park
Golden Gate
 Koreatown
Longfellow
Piedmont Avenue
Rockridge
Santa Fe
Temescal
Fairview Park
Shafter
Gaskill
Paradise Park

Media
Oakland North has covered the area since 2008 and Oakland Local since 2009.

References

Neighborhoods in Oakland, California